Birch is an unincorporated community located in the town of Sanborn, Ashland County, Wisconsin, United States.

Birch was so named because the original town site was a forest of white birch.

References

Unincorporated communities in Ashland County, Wisconsin
Unincorporated communities in Wisconsin